Heikki Vihtori Hasu (born 21 March 1926) is a Finnish retired Nordic skier who competed in the 1948 and 1952 Olympics.

Career
He won a gold and a silver medal in the individual Nordic combined event, respectively, and a gold in the 4 × 10 km cross-country relay in 1952. He placed fourth in the individual 18 km race at both Olympics, losing the bronze medal by seconds and served as the Finnish flag bearer in 1952.

Hasu won two medals at the 1950 FIS Nordic World Ski Championships, with a gold in the Nordic combined and a silver in the 4 × 10 km relay. He won the Nordic combined event at the Holmenkollen ski festival in 1953. Hasu became the first Finn to be awarded the Holmenkollen medal in 1952 (shared with Stein Eriksen, Torbjørn Falkanger and Nils Karlsson). He is also the last Holmenkollen medalist to win in more than one nordic skiing discipline. Hasu was selected as the Finnish Sportsperson of the Year in 1948 and 1950.

Hasu was a farmer, and after retiring from competitions served two terms in the Parliament of Finland in 1962–66 and 1967–70. A statue in his honor is erected in Anjalankoski.

Cross-country skiing results
All results are sourced from the International Ski Federation (FIS).

Olympic Games
 1 medal – (1 gold)

World Championships
1 medal – (1 silver)

References

External links

 . Cross-country skiing
 . Nordic combined
 Holmenkollen medalists – click Holmenkollmedaljen for downloadable pdf file 
 Holmenkollen winners since 1892 – click Vinnere for downloadable pdf file 

1926 births
Living people
People from Kouvola
Cross-country skiers at the 1948 Winter Olympics
Cross-country skiers at the 1952 Winter Olympics
Finnish male cross-country skiers
Finnish male Nordic combined skiers
Holmenkollen medalists
Holmenkollen Ski Festival winners
Nordic combined skiers at the 1948 Winter Olympics
Nordic combined skiers at the 1952 Winter Olympics
Olympic cross-country skiers of Finland
Olympic Nordic combined skiers of Finland
Olympic gold medalists for Finland
Olympic silver medalists for Finland
Olympic medalists in cross-country skiing
Olympic medalists in Nordic combined
FIS Nordic World Ski Championships medalists in cross-country skiing
FIS Nordic World Ski Championships medalists in Nordic combined
Medalists at the 1948 Winter Olympics
Medalists at the 1952 Winter Olympics
Sportspeople from Kymenlaakso
20th-century Finnish people